Vanitie was a yacht owned by Alexander Smith Cochran that was selected to take part in selection trials for the America's Cup in 1914 against Sir Thomas Lipton's yacht Shamrock IV.

History
On June 17, 1914 William S. Dennis was replaced by Harry Haff, son of Hank Haff as the captain of the yacht. Vanitie lost to Resolute in the 1914 trials. Defense of the cup was put off during World War I. The 1920 campaign was not successful and Vanitie lost 7–4 in the final selection series, again against Resolute which went on to successfully defend the America's Cup on behalf of the New York Yacht Club.

References

External links
The International Yacht Race Technical article, Marine Engineering, July 1920 by C. A. McAllister including photos.

Yachts of New York Yacht Club members
America's Cup defenders